Andres Arango (born April 23, 1983) is a Colombian-born Canadian former soccer player who played in the Canadian Professional Soccer League, USL A-League, and the North American Soccer League. Arango is currently a coach with Florida Premier FC in the United Premier Soccer League.

Club career

Youth and College
Arango moved from his native Colombia to Canada with his parents as a young child. He played college soccer for Humber College where he won the Provincial and National Championship and was voted MVP of the national tournament.

Early career
Arango began his career in 2002 with the York Region Shooters in the Canadian Professional Soccer League. In 2003, he signed with the Montreal Impact of the USL A-League. After failing to break into the starting lineup he was traded in the off-season to league rivals the Toronto Lynx in exchange for veteran defender Mauricio Vincello.

The trade to Toronto provided Arango with more playing time opportunities as he played in 22 games throughout the season. He recorded his first goal for Toronto on July 18, 2004, versus Calgary Mustangs. He re-signed with Toronto for the 2005 season. At the conclusion of the season, he was named the club's Defensive Player of the Year. In 2006, he returned to Toronto for the third and final season with the club. During the 2006 season, he was named Toronto Lynx Defensive Player of the Year for the second straight year. He also played in the 2006 Open Canada Cup final where Toronto finished as runners up to Ottawa St. Anthony Italia.

Montreal Impact 
After the relegation of Toronto to the Premier Development League in 2007, he returned to his former club the Montreal Impact on a two-year deal. Originally Toronto FC of the Major League Soccer expressed interest in Arango but instead chose Montreal as his final decision. In the initial stages of the season, he assisted Montreal in achieving an eight-game undefeated streak. Throughout the season he aided Montreal in successfully winning the 2007 Voyageurs Cup.

United States 
In 2008, he played abroad in the United States as league rivals Minnesota Thunder signed him along with former Impact teammate Frederico Moojen. He re-signed with Minnesota for the 2009 season. In 2010, the Minnesota Thunder folded and was succeeded by NSC Minnesota Stars where he was granted a contract on February 25, 2010. In his debut season with Minnesota, he served as the team captain. After a single season with Minnesota Stars, he had his contract terminated in early 2011.

Arango signed a two-year contract with FC Tampa Bay of the North American Soccer League in 2011. He made his debut for Tampa on April 23, 2011, against former club Montreal Impact. In 2012, he assisted Tampa Bay in winning the NASL Championship after defeating Minnesota Stars in a two-game series. He re-signed with Tampa Bay for the 2013 season. Following the 2013 NASL season, Arango announced his retirement on March 1, 2014.

International career 
Arango also featured for the Canadian U20 team that made it to the quarter-finals in the 2003 FIFA World Youth Championship. He played in the quarterfinal match where Spain eliminated Canada from the tournament.

Managerial career 
In January 2020, Arango was announced as the head coach for the Tampa Bay Rowdies U23 USL League Two side. Due to the COVID-19 pandemic the season was canceled and the team was replaced by Tampa Bay United SC.

Honours
Tampa Bay Rowdies
NASL Championship
Winners: 2012

References

External links
 

Canadian expatriate sportspeople in the United States
Canadian expatriate soccer players
Canadian soccer players
Colombian emigrants to Canada
Expatriate soccer players in the United States
Colombian expatriate footballers
Colombian footballers
Association football defenders
Tampa Bay Rowdies players
Humber College alumni
Minnesota United FC (2010–2016) players
Minnesota Thunder players
Montreal Impact (1992–2011) players
Naturalized citizens of Canada
North American Soccer League players
Soccer players from Toronto
Toronto Lynx players
USL First Division players
USSF Division 2 Professional League players
1983 births
Living people
Canada men's youth international soccer players
Canada men's under-23 international soccer players
A-League (1995–2004) players
York Region Shooters players
Canadian Soccer League (1998–present) players
Footballers from Medellín
USL League Two coaches
United Premier Soccer League coaches